Rho Aquilae, ρ Aquilae, is the Bayer designation for a star in the northern constellation of Delphinus. It has an apparent visual magnitude of 4.94 and is bright enough to be seen with the naked eye in good conditions.

Distance, proper motion and constellation
Relatively high proper motion resulted in the star crossing the border from Aquila into Delphinus in 1992. Rho Aquilae is therefore a rare occurrence of a mismatch between current constellation and Bayer designation constellation. The star is in the low-northern constellation of Delphinus therefore at least seasonally visible to all but the high southern latitudes.

Chinese constellations and components
This star has the traditional name Tso Ke, from the Cantonese 左旗 jo keih meaning "the left flag". In Chinese,  ( in Mandarin), within the Ox, refers to an asterism consisting of this star, α, β, γ, δ, ζ, 11, 13, and 14 Sagittae stars of Sagitta to the west.

Physical characteristics
Rho Aquilae is an A-type main sequence star with a stellar classification of A2 V. This star is about 400 million years old and it displays an excess emission of infrared radiation that may be explained by a circumstellar disk of dust.

References

External links
 Simbad
 Image
 HR 7724

Tso Ke
192425
Aquilae, Rho
A-type main-sequence stars
Aquila (constellation)
Delphinus (constellation)
099742
Aquilae, 67
7724
Durchmusterung objects